(November 17, 1630 – June 29, 1666) was a Japanese daimyō of the Edo period, who ruled the Tokushima Domain. His court title was Awa no kami.

Family
 Father: Hachisuka Tadateru
 Mother: Reishoin (d.1655)
 Wife: Kinhime (d.1703)
 Concubine: Inai no Kata
 Children:
 Hachisuka Tsunamichi by Kinhime
 Yukihime married Niwa Nagatsugu by Inai no Kata

Reference

1630 births
1666 deaths
Daimyo
Hachisuka clan